The 2022 Atlantic 10 men's soccer tournament will be the Atlantic 10 men's soccer tournament for the 2022 season. The tournament will decide the Atlantic 10 Conference champion and guaranteed representative into the 2022 NCAA Division I Men's Soccer Tournament. All games in the tournament will be played at the campus sites of the higher seeds. The defending champions are Saint Louis.

Seeding 

The top eight teams in the regular season earned a spot in the tournament. Teams were seeded based on regular season conference record and tiebreakers were used to determine seedings of teams that finished with the same record. La Salle earned the seventh seed over UMass through composite record versus common conference opponents tiebreaker. Loyola-Chicago earned the fourth seed in the three-way tiebreaker while George Washington and Dayton were awarded the fifth and sixth seeds.

Bracket

Source:

Statistics

Goalscorers

All-Tournament team 

MVP in Bold

References 

 
Atlantic 10 Men's Soccer Tournament